Aizoon or Aizoön is a genus of flowering plants in the iceplant family, Aizoaceae.

Distribution
Apart from A. canariense (which is native to Macaronesia, North Africa, Southern Africa, Horn of Africa and West Asia) all species are native to southern Africa.

It has been introduced to California, Central Chile, Florida, New Jersey, and Spain.

Species
There are currently 43 accepted species.
 Aizoon acutifolium (Adamson) Klak
 Aizoon affine (Sond.) Klak
 Aizoon africanum (L.) Klak
Aizoon asbestinum Schltr.
Aizoon canariense L.
 Aizoon collinum (Eckl. & Zeyh.) Klak
 Aizoon cryptocarpum (Fenzl) Klak
 Aizoon crystallinum Eckl. & Zeyh.
 Aizoon cymosum (Adamson) Klak
 Aizoon dregeanum (Fenzl ex Sond.) Klak
 Aizoon ecklonis (Walp.) Klak
 Aizoon exiguum (Adamson) Klak
 Aizoon filiforme (Thunb.) Klak
 Aizoon fruticosum L.f.
Aizoon giessii Friedrich
Aizoon glabrum Ewart
 Aizoon glanduliferum (Bittrich) Klak
 Aizoon glinoides L.f.
 Aizoon herniariifolium (C.Presl) Klak
 Aizoon hispidissimum (Fenzl ex Sond.) Klak
 Aizoon karooicum Compton
 Aizoon mezianum (K.Müll.) Klak
 Aizoon namaense (Schinz) Klak
 Aizoon neorigidum Klak
 Aizoon pallens (Eckl. & Zeyh.) Klak
 Aizoon paniculatum L.
 Aizoon papulosum Eckl. & Zeyh.
 Aizoon plinthoides Klak
 Aizoon portulacaceum (Fenzl ex Sond.) Klak
 Aizoon prostratum (G.Schellenb. & Schltr.) Klak
 Aizoon pruinosum (Sond.) Klak
 Aizoon pubescens Eckl. & Zeyh.
 Aizoon rehmannii (G.Schellenb.) Klak
 Aizoon rigidum L.f.
 Aizoon sarcophyllum (Fenzl ex Sond.) Klak
 Aizoon sarmentosum L.f.
 Aizoon schellenbergii Adamson
 Aizoon secundum L.f.
 Aizoon sericeum (Pax) Klak
 Aizoon subcarnosum (Adamson) Klak
 Aizoon virgatum Welw. ex Oliv.
 Aizoon zeyheri Sond.

References

Aizoaceae
Aizoaceae genera